Anne Schwanewilms (born 1967, in Gelsenkirchen) is a German lyric soprano. She studied gardening before training in Cologne as a singer with the German bass Hans Sotin. She is particularly associated with performing the works of Richard Wagner, Franz Schreker, Alban Berg, and Richard Strauss. She sang the lead role of Carlotta in Franz Schreker's Die Gezeichneten at the Salzburg Festival in 2005, recorded and subsequently published on DVD by Opus Arte.

She sang Gutrune in James Levine's Der Ring des Nibelungen.

On 26 January 2011, she performed the role of the Marschallin in the jubilee centenary performance of Der Rosenkavalier by Richard Strauss at the Semperoper in Dresden.

Her debut at the Metropolitan Opera in New York City in the role of the Kaiserin in Die Frau ohne Schatten took place on 7 November 2013.

Since 2018/19 semester, she is a professor of singing at the Hochschule für Musik Franz Liszt, Weimar.

Awards 
In 2002, she was named Singer of the Year by the German magazine Opernwelt.

Reference

External links 
 
 

1967 births
Living people
People from Gelsenkirchen
German operatic sopranos
Academic staff of the Hochschule für Musik Franz Liszt, Weimar
20th-century German  women opera singers
21st-century German  women  opera singers